Xianmi is a township of Menyuan County, Qinghai, China. It has a population of 6,130. The county seat is located in Dazhuang village.

The township is mountainous and the land is mostly undeveloped, with 45% covered by forests. Its economy relies on agriculture and husbandry.

The ancient Tibetan Xianmi Temple (:de:Semnyi Monastery), built in 1623, is located in Dazhuang.

References 

Township-level divisions of Qinghai
Haibei Tibetan Autonomous Prefecture